The Hull Vikings were a speedway team from Hull, England, who operated primarily from The Boulevard (stadium) and Craven Park from 1971 to 2005.

History 
The team originated as the Hull Angels and were based at Hedon Stadium in Hedon on the outskirts of Hull between 1947 and mid-1949. Their inaugural league season was in the 1948 Speedway National League Division Three where they finished 9th. The team withdrew during the 1949 season and were replaced by the Swindon Robins 

The Boulevard was famous as the long time home of Rugby Football League team Hull FC. During the years of racing at The Boulevard, the Vikings had the dubious distinction of being the last league speedway team ever to appear at the famous West Ham Stadium, on 23 May 1972, when they beat the closing West Ham Hammers 40–38. The team raced at the Boulevard for 11 seasons and in 1978 they signed the legendary New Zealander Ivan Mauger, a five times world champion at the time. The team finished third in the league during 1978 and then finished second the following season, during the 1979 British League season. The 1979 season also saw Mauger become the world champion for a record sixth time. Promotional changes, falling crowds and financial problems eventually saw the Vikings demise after the 1981 season. 

On 5 April 1995, speedway came back to Hull, this time at Craven Park, the home of the city's other rugby league team, Hull Kingston Rovers.

Although the Vikings have raced in speedway's top flight, the Elite League in 1999, it was in the Premier League where they enjoyed the most success, racing to the treble in 2004. By becoming Premier League Champions, holders of the Knockout Cup and the Craven Shield, the team became the most successful sporting team in Hull's history, in terms of awards. However, just one year later, in 2005, the club was forced to close its doors due to a spate of crippling financial problems. Although potential new owners have been mooted, the team remains homeless.

The prospect of speedway returning to Hull would require a new venue to be built as The Boulevard was closed in 2009 and demolished in 2010 while Craven Park was redeveloped after the Vikings departure with the speedway track removed and the ground becoming a rectangular sports venue suited to rugby league.

Season summary

Notable riders
World Champions who rode for the Vikings in the 1970s included New Zealanders Ivan Mauger and Barry Briggs, along with Egon Müller from West Germany who rode a single season in Hull in 1976. While Mauger and Briggs had already won World Championships before joining Hull, Müller would not win the title until 1983, though like Mauger he was a World Long Track Champion having won the title in 1974 and 1975.

References

Sport in Kingston upon Hull
Defunct British speedway teams